Mutharam mandal (or Muthani mandal) is situated in Peddapalli district of Telangana state of India.

Villages
Mutharam mandal has the following villages:
 Adavisrirampur
 
 
 Dharyapur
 Ippalapalli
 Keshanapalli
 Khammampalli
 
 Lakkaram
 Machupeta
 Mutharam
 Mydambanda
 Odedu
 Parupalli
 Potharam
 Sarvaram
 Shatharajpalli
 Sukravarampeta

References 

Mandals in Peddapalli district